"Hell of a Life" is a song by American hip hop recording artist T.I., released as a single on October 6, 2009. The song serves as the second single from the re-release of his 2008 album, Paper Trail: Case Closed, which was ultimately released as an extended play (EP). The song contains a sample of "Avulekile Amasango" as performed by Ishmael.

Music video
The music video for the song was released on October 5, 2009 through Trap Muzik. The music video reflects T.I.'s career and narrates the final 24 hours before beginning his prison sentence for illegal weapons.

Track listing
Digital single

Chart positions

References

2008 songs
2009 singles
T.I. songs
Grand Hustle Records singles
Atlantic Records singles
Music videos directed by Erik White
Song recordings produced by Danja (record producer)
Songs written by T.I.
Songs written by Danja (record producer)
Songs written by Ozzy Osbourne
Songs written by Geezer Butler
Songs written by Tony Iommi
Songs written by Bill Ward (musician)